Vehicle audio is equipment installed in a car or other vehicle to provide in-car entertainment and information for the vehicle occupants. Until the 1950s it consisted of a simple AM radio. Additions since then have included FM radio (1952), 8-track tape players, cassette players, record players, CD players (1984), DVD players, Blu-ray players, navigation systems, Bluetooth telephone integration, and smartphone controllers like CarPlay and Android Auto. Once controlled from the dashboard with a few buttons, they can now be controlled by steering wheel controls and voice commands.

Initially implemented for listening to music and radio, vehicle audio is now part of car telematics, telecommunication, in-vehicle security, handsfree calling, navigation, and remote diagnostics systems. The same loudspeakers may also be used to minimize road and engine noise with active noise control, or they may be used to augment engine sounds, for instance making a smaller engine sound bigger.

History

Radio

In 1904, well before commercially viable technology for mobile radio was in place, American inventor and self-described "Father of Radio" Lee de Forest demonstrated a car radio at the 1904 Louisiana Purchase Exposition in St. Louis.

Around 1920, vacuum tube technology had matured to the point where the availability of radio receivers made radio broadcasting viable. A technical challenge was that the vacuum tubes in the radio receivers required 50 to 250 volt direct current, but car batteries ran at 6V. Voltage was stepped up with a vibrator that provided a pulsating DC which could be converted to a higher voltage with a transformer, rectified, and filtered to create higher-voltage DC.

In 1924, Kelly's Motors in NSW, Australia, installed its first car radio.

In 1930, the American Galvin Manufacturing Corporation marketed a Motorola branded radio receiver for $130. It was expensive: the contemporary Ford Model A cost $540. A Plymouth sedan, "wired for Philco Transitone radio without extra cost," was advertised in Ladies' Home Journal in 1931. In 1932 in Germany the Blaupunkt AS 5 medium wave and longwave radio was marketed for 465 Reichsmark, about one third of the price of a small car. Because it took nearly 10 litres of space, it could not be located near the driver, and was operated via a steering wheel remote control. In 1933 Crossley Motors offered a factory fitted car radio for £35. By the late 1930s, push button AM radios were considered a standard feature. In 1946, there were an estimated 9 million AM car radios in use.

An FM receiver was offered by Blaupunkt in 1952. In 1953, Becker introduced the AM/FM Becker Mexico with a Variometer tuner, basically a station-search or scan function.

In April 1955, the Chrysler Corporation announced that it was offering a Mopar model 914HR branded Philco all transistor car radio, as a $150 option for its 1956 Chrysler and Imperial car models. Chrysler Corporation had decided to discontinue its all transistor car radio option at the end of 1956, due to it being too expensive, and replaced it with a cheaper hybrid (transistors and low voltage vacuum tubes) car radio for its new 1957 car models. In 1963, Becker introduced the Monte Carlo, a tubeless solid state radio with no vacuum tubes.

From 1974 to 2005, the Autofahrer-Rundfunk-Informationssystem was used by the German ARD network. Developed jointly by the Institut für Rundfunktechnik and Blaupunkt, it indicated the presence of traffic announcements through manipulation of the 57kHz subcarrier of the station's FM signal. ARI was replaced by the Radio Data System.

The AM/FM radio combined with a CD player has remained a mainstay of car audio, despite being obsolescent in non-car applications.

In the 2010s, internet radio and satellite radio came into competition with FM radio. By this time some models were offering 5.1 surround sound.

Physical media and connectivity
Mobile players for physical media have been provided for vinyl records, 8-track tapes, cassette tapes, compact discs, and MP3s. The increased sophistication of the vehicle audio system to accommodate such media has made the audio unit a common target of car break-ins, so these are equipped with anti-theft systems too.

Attempts at providing mobile play from media were first made with vinyl records, beginning in the 1950s. The first such player was offered by Chrysler as an option on 1956 Chrysler, Desoto, Dodge, and Plymouth cars. The player was developed by CBS Labs and played a limited selection of specially provided 7-inch discs at 16⅔ RPM. The unit was an expensive option and was dropped after two years. Cheaper options using commonly available 45 rpm records were made by RCA Victor (available only in 1961) and Norelco. All of these players required extra pressure on the needle to avoid skipping during vehicle movement, which caused accelerated wear on the records.

In 1962, Muntz introduced the Wayfarer 4-track cartridge tape player.  Celebrities, including Frank Sinatra, had these units installed in their cars.

In 1965, Ford and Motorola jointly introduced the in-car 8-track tape player as optional equipment for 1966 Ford car models. In 1968, a dashboard car radio with a built-in cassette tape player was introduced by Philips. In subsequent years, cassettes supplanted the 8-track and improved the technology, with longer play times, better tape quality, auto-reverse, and Dolby noise reduction. They were popular throughout the 1970s and 1980s. Cassette players were still found in vehicles as late as the 2005-06 Honda CR-V and 2008 Acura TL. There have also been vehicle audio units which are able to accept both compact cassettes and CDs.

Pioneer introduced the CDX-1, the first car CD (compact disc) player, in 1984. It was known for its improved sound quality, instant track skipping, and the format's increased durability over cassette tapes. Car CD changers started to gain popularity in the late 80s and continuing throughout the 90s, with the earlier devices being trunk-mounted and later ones being mounted in the head unit, some able to accommodate six to ten CDs. Stock and aftermarket CD players began appearing in the late 1980s, competing with the cassette. The first car with an OEM CD player was the 1987 Lincoln Town Car, and the last new cars in the American market to be factory-equipped with a cassette deck in the dashboard was the 2010 Lexus SC430, and the Ford Crown Victoria. The car cassette adapter allowed motorists to plug in a portable music player (CD player, MP3 player) into an existing installed cassette tape deck.

In the early 21st century, compact digital storage media – Bluetooth-enabled devices, thumb drives, memory cards, and dedicated hard drives – came to be accommodated by vehicle audio systems. Around this time auxiliary input jacks and USB ports were added to connect MP3 players to the vehicle's speakers. Minivans and three-row SUVs have an available rear entertainment system with a DVD player to entertain passengers. 

The automobile head unit became increasingly important as a housing for front and backup dashcams, navis, and operating systems with multiple functions, such as Android Auto, CarPlay and MirrorLink, allowing a smartphone's music library and navigation apps to be controlled via the vehicle's infotainment system.   Latest models are coming equipped with features like Bluetooth technology along with HDMI port for better connectivity. Screen size varies from 5-inch to 7-inch for the double Din car stereos.

Active noise control and noise synthesis
The automobile sound system may be part of an active noise control system which reduces engine and road noise for the driver and passengers. One or more microphones are used to pick up sound from various places on the vehicle, especially the engine compartment, underside or exhaust pipes, and these signals are handled by a digital signal processor (DSP) then sent to the loudspeakers in such a way that the processed signal reduces or cancels out the outside noise heard inside the car. An early system focused only on engine noise was developed by Lotus and licensed for the 1992 Nissan Bluebird models sold in Japan. Lotus later teamed with Harman in 2009 to develop a more complete noise reduction system, including road and tire noise as well as chassis vibrations. One benefit of active noise control is that the car can weigh less, with less sound-deadening material used, and without a heavy balance shaft in the engine. Removing the balance shaft also increases fuel efficiency. The 2013 Honda Accord used an active noise control system, as did the 2013 Lincoln luxury line and the Ford C-Max and Fusion models. Other operating data may also play a part in the DSP, data such as the engine's speed in revolutions per minute (RPM) or the car's highway speed. A multiple source reduction system may reach as much as 80% of the noise removed.

The same system may also be used to synthesize or augment engine noise to make the engine sound more powerful to the driver. For the 2015 Ford Mustang EcoBoost Fastback and EcoBoost Fastback Premium, an "Active Noise Control" system was developed that amplifies the engine sound through the car speakers. A similar system is used in the F-150 pickup truck. Volkswagen uses a Soundaktor, a special speaker to play sounds in cars such as the Golf GTi and Beetle Turbo. BMW plays a recorded sample of its motors through the car speakers, using different samples according to the engine's load and power.

Components and terms
The stock system is the OEM application that the vehicle's manufacturer specified to be installed when the car was built.

Aftermarket components can also be used.

 Head unit: Headunit products includes the screen and buttons and are manufactured mainly in DIN form factor, which refers to ISO 7736. Head units come as single DIN or double DIN.
 Connectors for car audio, where ISO 10487 Harness Adapter is used.
 Capacitors.
 Mobile audio power amplifiers.

Amplifiers increase the power level of audio signals. Some head units have built-in stereo amplifiers. Other car audio systems use a separate stand-alone amplifier. Every amplifier has a rated power level sometimes noted on the head unit with the built-in amplifier, or on the label of a stand-alone unit.
 Car component speakers which include woofer, tweeter and sub-woofer.
 Sound-deadening material is often used in the door cavities and boot area to dampen excess vibration of the panels in the car in response to loud subwoofer bass tones, especially the boot (trunk).
 Optical drives with slot-loading mechanism.

Legality
Excessively loud sound systems in automobiles violate the noise ordinance of municipalities, some of which have outlawed them. In 2002, the U.S. Department of Justice issued a guide to police officers on how to deal with problems associated with loud audio systems in cars.

Gallery

See also
 List of car audio manufacturers and brands
Active sound design

References

American inventions
Audio players
In-car entertainment
Radio hobbies
Sound production technology
Automotive accessories
Automotive technologies